August Schuster Brittain (November 29, 1909 – February 16, 1974) was a Major League Baseball player who played with the Cincinnati Reds in . He played in two games as a pinch hitter and one game as a catcher.

External links

Cincinnati Reds players
1909 births
1974 deaths
Baseball players from North Carolina
Beckley Black Knights players
Fort Worth Cats players
Greenville Spinners players
Lexington A's players
Montgomery Rebels players
Montreal Royals players
Rocky Mount Leafs players
Salisbury Cardinals players
Springfield Nationals players
Syracuse Chiefs players
Trenton Senators players
Tulsa Oilers (baseball) players
Wilmington Pirates players
Burials at Oakdale Cemetery